is a Japanese professional baseball pitcher for the Fukuoka SoftBank Hawks of Nippon Professional Baseball.

Career
On October 25, 2018, Kaino was drafted by the Fukuoka Softbank Hawks first overall pick in the 2018 Nippon Professional Baseball draft.
 
On March 29, 2019, kaino pitched his debut game against the Saitama Seibu Lions as a relief pitcher, and won the game for the first time in the Pacific League. In 2019, the rookie year, he finished the regular season with a 2–5 Win–loss record, a 4.14 ERA, 73 strikeouts in  innings, 26 Holds, and 8 saves. And he pitched as a Setup man against the Yomiuri Giants in the 2019 Japan Series.

In 2020, Kaino hurt his right elbow in spring training and spent the season rehabilitating his right elbow.
And he had surgery on his right elbow on December 4.

In 2021 season, Kaino spent the first half of the season in rehabilitation, but on August 15, against the Hokkaido Nippon-Ham Fighters, he pitched for the first time in 662 days in the Pacific League. He recorded with a 22 Games pitched, a 0–2 Win–loss record, a 4.35 ERA, a 4 Holds, a one saves. and a 25 strikeouts in 20.2 innings.

In 2022 season, he finished the regular season with a 27 Games pitched, a 2–0 Win–loss record, a 2.52 ERA,  a 3 Holds, and a 27 strikeouts in 25 innings.

International career
Kaino represented the Japan national baseball team at the 2018 USA VS Japan Collegiate All-Star Series, 2018 Haarlem Baseball Week and 2019 WBSC Premier12.

During Toyo University era, Kaino was selected as the Japan for the 2018 USA VS Japan Collegiate All-Star Series and 2018 Haarlem Baseball Week.

On October 24, 2019, he was selected as the Japan national baseball team in the 2019 WBSC Premier12.

References

External links

Career statistics - NPB.jp
20 Hiroshi Kaino PLAYERS2022 - Fukuoka SoftBank Hawks Official site

1996 births
Living people
Fukuoka SoftBank Hawks players
Japanese baseball players
Nippon Professional Baseball pitchers
Toyo University alumni
Baseball people from Hyōgo Prefecture
2019 WBSC Premier12 players